Paradeep (Sl. No.: 101) is a Vidhan Sabha constituency of Jagatsinghpur district, Odisha.

This constituency includes Paradeep, Kujang block and 7 Gram panchayats (Amberi, Kolar, Samantarapur, Poragadei, Manijanga, Bodhei and Jadatira) of Tirtol block.

Elected Members

Three elections have been held since 2009, 2014 and the latest one being in 2019. 
Elected members from the Paradeep constituency are :
2019: Sambit Rout (BJD) 
2014: (101): Damodar Rout (BJD)
2009: (101): Damodar Rout (BJD)

2014 Election Result
In 2014 election, Biju Janata Dal candidate Damodar Rout defeated Indian National Congress candidate Arindam Sarkhel by a margin of 38,600 votes.

2009 Election Result
In 2009 election, Biju Janata Dal candidate Damodara Rout defeated Independent candidate Ramesh Samantaray by a margin of 30,351 votes.

Notes

References

Assembly constituencies of Odisha
Jagatsinghpur district